Zoolea is a South American genus of praying mantises.

Species
The Mantodea Species File lists:
 Zoolea descampsi Roy & Ehrmann, 2009
 Zoolea lobipes Olivier, 1792 - type species
 Zoolea major Giglio-Tos, 1914
 Zoolea minor Giglio-Tos, 1914
 Zoolea orba Burmeister, 1838

Description
A characteristic of this genus is anterior femora with superior pre-apical lobes.
 This genus is one which contains species known as Unicorn Mantis.

References

Mantidae
Mantodea of South America